Edgar M. Clinton (May 21, 1877 – December 3, 1954) was an American football coach. He served as the head football coach at Knox College in Galesburg, Illinois in 1900 and at Iowa State University in 1901, compiling a career college football coaching record of 8–10–2. A native of Polo, Illinois, Clinton played football at the University of Illinois at Urbana–Champaign in 1896 and at Stanford University in 1898.

Head coaching record

References

External links
 

1877 births
1954 deaths
19th-century players of American football
American football halfbacks
Iowa State Cyclones football coaches
Knox Prairie Fire football coaches
Stanford Cardinal football players
People from Polo, Illinois
Players of American football from Illinois